This is a list of events in British radio during 1969.

Events

January
18 January – Saturday Club is aired on BBC Radio 1 for the final time.

February
14 February – Radio comedian Kenneth Horne collapses and dies of a heart attack while hosting the annual Guild of Television Producers' and Directors' Awards at The Dorchester hotel in London, having just presented an award to Barry Took, co-scriptwriter of Round the Horne, and invited viewers to tune in to its fifth series, due to start on 16 March. By 24 February the BBC has decided that Round the Horne cannot continue without its star and the scripts for series five are hastily reworked by writers Johnnie Mortimer and Brian Cooke with Myles Rudge into a new vehicle for former co-star Kenneth Williams called Stop Messing About which opens on BBC Radio 2 on 6 April and runs for two seasons.

March
No events

April
25 April – The last edition of daily soap opera The Dales is broadcast on BBC Radio 2 after 5,531 episodes.
28 April – The first edition of daily soap opera Waggoners' Walk is broadcast on BBC Radio 2, replacing The Dales.

May
No events

June
11 June – The Organist Entertains, presented by Robin Richmond, is broadcast for the first time.

July
10 July – The BBC publishes a report called "Broadcasting in the Seventies" proposing the reorganisation of programmes on the national networks and replacing regional broadcasting on BBC Radio 4 with BBC Local Radio. The report begins to be implemented the following year and the former BBC Home Service regions gradually disappear although regional programming on Radio 4 does not end fully until the end of 1982.
20–21 July – BBC Radios 1 and 2 stay on air all night to provide live coverage of the landing on the Moon and of Neil Armstrong's first steps onto the Moon's surface.

August
No events

September
No events

October
No events

November
No events

December
No events

Station debuts

Programme debuts
 28 April – Waggoners' Walk on BBC Radio 2 (1969–1980)
 11 June – The Organist Entertains on BBC Radio 2 (1969–2018)  
 6 July – The Big Business Lark on BBC Radio 4 (1969)

Continuing radio programmes

1940s
 Sunday Half Hour (1940–2018)
 Desert Island Discs (1942–Present)
 Family Favourites (1945–1980)
 Down Your Way (1946–1992)
 Letter from America (1946–2004)
 Woman's Hour (1946–Present)
 Twenty Questions (1947–1976)
 Any Questions? (1948–Present)
 A Book at Bedtime (1949–Present)

1950s
 The Archers (1950–Present)
 Listen with Mother (1950–1982)
 From Our Own Correspondent (1955–Present)
 Pick of the Pops (1955–Present)
 The Clitheroe Kid (1957–1972)
 My Word! (1957–1988)
 Test Match Special (1957–Present)
 The Today Programme (1957–Present)
 The Navy Lark (1959–1977)
 Sing Something Simple (1959–2001)
 Your Hundred Best Tunes (1959–2007)

1960s
 Farming Today (1960–Present)
 In Touch (1961–Present)
 The Men from the Ministry (1962–1977)
 I'm Sorry, I'll Read That Again (1964–1973)
 Petticoat Line (1965–1979)
 The World at One (1965–Present)
 The Official Chart (1967–Present)
 Just a Minute (1967–Present)
 The Living World (1968–Present)

Births
February – Fi Glover, radio presenter
20 February – Robin Ince, comedian
11 April – Cerys Matthews, Welsh singer and broadcaster
7 June – Adam Buxton, actor and comedian
14 June – Shaun Ley, news presenter
13 August – Toby Foster, comedian, promoter and radio presenter
22 August – Kathy Clugston, Northern Ireland-born newsreader
22 September – Sue Perkins, comedy performer and broadcast presenter
2 December – Matthew Sweet, cultural historian and broadcaster
12 December – Rodney P (Panton), MC, "godfather of British hip hop" and broadcaster

Deaths
14 February – Kenneth Horne, radio comedian (born 1907)
25 March – Billy Cotton, bandleader (born 1899)
27 October – Eric Maschwitz, broadcasting executive, scriptwriter and lyricist (born 1901)

See also 
 1969 in British music
 1969 in British television
 1969 in the United Kingdom
 List of British films of 1969

References

Radio
British Radio, 1969 In
Years in British radio